Taichung’s 7th Redevelopment Zone is located in Xitun District and Nantun District, known to many local residents by its abbreviated Mandarin name "Qiqi" (七期).

This area is adjacent to the 3rd, 4th, and 5th Redevelopment Zone. Before Taichung's 7th Redevelopment Zone Plan, only a few farmhouses were scattered along a limited number of narrow streets. Today, this area is the site of Taichung's new city government center, and it is the central business district (CBD) of Taichung City. It features broad and widely spaced boulevards, attractive apartments, department stores, and office towers, which are brightly lit at night. There are many universities nearby, such as Tunghai University and Feng Chia University.

Historical Development 

Its historical development began in 1986 when the Taichung City government designated the agricultural area south of Taichung Port Rd. (present-day Taiwan Boulevard) and west of Wenxin Rd. as the 7th Redevelopment Zone. The goal of this redevelopment was originally to set up a secondary commercial center to relieve the old downtown area(Central District).  However, as the population continued to grow and the scale of the city expanded, Taichung's city center gradually moved westward.

In February 1990, the 7th Redevelopment Zone was officially carried out, with an area of 353.3983 hectares and a total of 5.54 billion New Taiwan dollars spent, making it the most expensive redevelopment zone at the time. The land redevelopment was completed in November 1992.

In 1996, the Taichung City Government planned to relocate the Taichung City Hall from Central District to this area, and since then the area has been positioned as the new municipal center. Therefore, after the 2000s, the 7th Redevelopment Zone gradually replaced the old downtown area as the central business district of Taichung.

Area Range

7th Redevelopment Zone starts from Wenxin Road in the east and ends at Huanzhong Road and Henan Road in the west, from Dadun 4th Street in the south to Taiwan Boulevard in the north.
Total consolidation area:353.3983 hectare
Building area:202.5476 hectare
Section names after the consolidation:Huiguo(惠國), Huitai(惠泰), Huimin(惠民), Huian(惠安), Huishun(惠順), Huiren(惠仁), Huiyi(惠義), Huili(惠禮), Huizhi(惠智) and Huixin(惠信)

Transportation 

In the future, the Taichung MRT Green line and Blue line will both pass through this area.

Road
Provincial Highway 74：Xitun 1
Taiwan Boulevard
Rail
Taichung MRT
Green line: Taichung City Hall, Shui-an Temple, Wenxin Forest Park

Main Buildings

Gallery

See also 
 Huilai Monument Archaeology Park
 Liming New Village
 Urban renewal

References 

 
Taichung
Central business districts in Taiwan
Planned cities in Taiwan